Aarschot is a railway station in the town of Aarschot, Flemish Brabant, Belgium. The station opened on 28 February 1863 and is located on the 35. The train services are operated by National Railway Company of Belgium (NMBS).

Train services
The station is served by the following services:

Intercity services (IC-08) Antwerp - Mechelen - Brussels Airport - Leuven - Hasselt
Intercity services (IC-09) Antwerp - Lier - Aarschot - Leuven (weekdays)
Intercity services (IC-09) Antwerp - Lier - Aarschot - Hasselt - Tongeren - Liege (weekends)
Intercity services (IC-20) Ghent - Aalst - Brussels - Hasselt - Tongeren (weekdays)
Local services (L-03) Leuven - Aarschot - Diest - Hasselt
Local services (L-23) Antwerp - Lier - Aarschot - Leuven

See also
 List of railway stations in Belgium

References

External links
 
 Aarschot railway station at Belgian Railways website

Railway stations in Belgium
Railway stations opened in 1863
Railway stations in Flemish Brabant